Naked Songs is Aya Matsuura's fourth studio album and her first self-cover album. She also has released a DVD of the Recording Sessions of this album (some of the songs featured on the CD are from the DVD and, on CD, have added a Brass Section and Backing Vocals) It contains some unplugged (hence, "Naked") re-recordings of her older material. It was released on November 29, 2006 and has sold 18,961 copies.

Track listings (CD)
 "Feel Your Groove"
 "Rock My Body"
 
 
 "I Know"
 
 "Love Namidairo"
 "Dokki Doki! Love Mail"
 "Tropical Koishiteru"
 "Don't Know Why" (Jesse Harris/Norah Jones Cover)
 
 "Dearest."

Track listings (DVD)
 *
 
 "Don't Know Why"
 
 "Dokki Doki! Love Mail"*
 
 "Happiness"
 "Tropical Koishiteru"*
 "I Know"*
 

 * - Denotes songs that were used in the "Naked Songs" CD and didn't have the Brass Section and Background Vocals included in the CD version.

Aya Matsuura albums
2006 compilation albums